Dje (Ђ ђ; italics: Ђ ђ)  is a letter of the Cyrillic script.

Dje is the sixth letter of the Serbian Cyrillic alphabet, used in Serbo-Croatian to represent the voiced alveolo-palatal affricate . Despite being a Cyrillic letter, it was also used in Latin-based Slovincian phonetic transcriptions, presumably with the same value.

Dje corresponds to the Latin letter D with stroke (Đ đ) in Gaj's Latin alphabet of Serbo-Croatian and is so transliterated.

History
Dje was constructed by request of Vuk Stefanović Karadžić. There were several proposed shapes of the letter (one by Pavle Solarić, another by Gligorije Geršić). The variant now in use was designed by Lukijan Mušicki; it was designed by modification of the letter Ћ, itself a revival of the old Cyrillic letter Djerv (Ꙉ). The new letter was adopted in Karadžić's 1818 dictionary and thus entered widespread usage.

Related letters and other similar characters
Ћ ћ: Cyrillic letter Tshe
Ѓ ѓ: Cyrillic letter Gje
Đ đ: Latin letter D with stroke
Ď ď: Latin letter D with caron
J j: Latin letter J
Ꙉ ꙉ: Old Cyrillic letter Djerv

Computing codes

References

External links

Serbian letters